Steve Berch is an American politician and businessman, currently serving in the Idaho House of Representatives. A Democrat, he is serving the House representing Seat A in Idaho Legislative District 15.

Education
Berch received a bachelor's degree in marketing from the University at Albany, SUNY; he subsequently received an MBA in management information systems from the University of Minnesota.

Career 
Berch worked at Hewlett-Packard as a manager for 35 years in Boise prior to being elected to the Idaho House of Representatives. He ran for a House seat five times, eventually winning the seat from Republican Lynn Luker on his fifth try with 54.5 percent of the vote.

Berch previously served on the Greater Boise Auditorium District board from 2013 to 2018.

Personal life 
He is married to Leslie Berch.

References

Year of birth missing (living people)
Place of birth missing (living people)
Living people
Democratic Party members of the Idaho House of Representatives
University of Minnesota people
People from Boise, Idaho
21st-century American politicians